El anónimo ("The Anonymous") is a 1933 Mexican film. It was directed by Fernando de Fuentes.

Plot

A drama based on the life of a Doctor (Carlos Orellana), who leads a decent life and whose wife (Gloria Iturbe) is an adultress

Cast

Gloria Iturbe
Carlos Orellana
Julio Villareal
Gloria Rubio
Luis G. Barreito
Elena Valdes

External links
 

1933 films
1930s Spanish-language films
Films directed by Fernando de Fuentes
Mexican black-and-white films
Mexican drama films
1933 drama films
1930s Mexican films